The men's flyweight event was part of the boxing programme at the 1932 Summer Olympics. The weight class was the lightest contested, and allowed boxers of up to 112 pounds (50.8 kilograms). The competition was held from Tuesday, August 9, 1932 to Saturday, August 13, 1932. Twelve boxers from twelve nations competed.

Medalists

Results

References

External links
 Official Report
 

Flyweight